The 622d Expeditionary Air Refueling Squadron is a provisional United States Air Force unit, assigned to United States Air Forces Europe to activate or inactivate as needed.  The squadron was first established during World War II as the 22d Photographic Reconnaissance Squadron.  It served in the European Theater of Operations, where it earned a Distinguished Unit Citation and a French Croix de Guerre with Palm for its actions in combat.

The unit was again active in the reserve as the 22d Reconnaissance Squadron from 1947 to 1949 but apparently was not equipped with its own aircraft.  In 1985 the squadron was consolidated with the 622d Air Refueling Squadron.

The 622d Air Refueling Squadron served with Tactical Air Command at England Air Force Base, Louisiana from July 1955 until April 1964, refueling tactical fighers and other tactical aircraft.  It was converted to provisional status in 2000 and operated from Istres le Tube Airfield.

History

World War II

The first predecessor of the squadron was activated at Peterson Field, Colorado in September 1942 as the 22d Photographic Reconnaissance Squadron, a component of the 5th Photographic Group. The outfit existed essentially on paper until 21 December 1943 when 12 officers and 129 enlisted men were transferred from the 10th Photographic Reconnaissance Squadron. There it served as a photographic reconnaissance unit until the end of the war.

The squadron arrived at the RAF Mount Farm airfield on 8 June 1943. The unit was equipped with Lockheed F-5 Lightning photographic aircraft and its first mission was flown on 24 June 1943. The 22d Photographic Squadron, along with the 13th and 14th Photographic Squadrons into the on 7 July 1943, when the 7th Photographic Reconnaissance and Mapping Group transferred to England on paper.  In 1943, the 22d was among the squadrons flying the first photo reconnaissance missions against Peenemünde.

It received a Distinguished Unit Citation for its coverage of bridges, marshalling yards, canals, highways, and other targets that contributed to the success of the Normandy Campaign.  It provided reconnaissance support for the Battle of the Bulge and the Rhine crossings.  Its work was also recognized by the French, who awarded the unit the French Croix de Guerre with Palm.

Air Force Reserve
The squadron was redesignated as the 22d Reconnaissance Squadron in 1947 and activated the reserve.  It apparently was not fully equipped and was inactivated in the summer of 1949 when Continental Air Command adopted the wing base organization for its reserve units.

Tactical Air Command
The 622d Air Refueling Squadron was established at Alexandria Air Force Base, Louisiana in 1955 to provide dedicated air refueling, initially for North American F-100 Super Sabres and later for other in-flight refueling capable Tactical Air Command fighters, fighter bombers, and reconnaissance aircraft.   The squadron was initially equipped with transferred Strategic Air Command Boeing KB-29M Superfortresses that were converted to aerial tankers using a British-developed probe and drogue refueling system.

The squadron re-equipped with Boeing KB-50 Superfortress tankers in 1957 which provided greater speed to refuel jet aircraft.   KB-50s were modified about 1960 to the KB-50J configuration, which added a General Electric J47 turbojet engine underneath each wing in place of the auxiliary fuel tanks in order to increase the speed of the aircraft while conducting air refueling operations.

By 1963 aircraft were phased out due to age. SAC, with KC-97s and KC-135s became the Air Force's single manager for air refueling. The squadron inactivated in early 1964 when KB-50Js sent to Aerospace Maintenance and Regeneration Center at Davis-Monthan Air Force Base, Arizona.

Recent operations

The consolidated squadron was converted to provisional status and redesignated the 622d Expeditionary Air Refueling Squadron. It operated from Istres le Tube in France from 2000 to 2004, providing air refueling to aircraft supporting the NATO Stabilisation Force in Bosnia and Herzegovina, Operation Joint Forge.

Lineage
 22d Reconnaissance Squadron
 Constituted as the 22d Photographic Reconnaissance Squadron on 14 July 1942
 Activated on 2 September 1942
 Redesignated 22d Photographic Squadron on 6 February 1943
 Redesignated 22d Photographic Reconnaissance Squadron on 13 November 1943
 Inactivated on 16 December 1945
 Redesignated 22d Reconnaissance Squadron, Photographic on 11 March 1947
 Activated in the reserve on 23 October 1947
 Inactivated on 27 June 1949
 Consolidated with the 622d Air Refueling Squadron as the 622d Air Refueling Squadron on 19 September 1985 (remained inactive)

622d Air Refueling Squadron
 Constituted as the 622d Air Refueling Squadron, Fighter-Bomber on 1 July 1955
 Activated on 18 July 1955
 Redesignated 622d Air Refueling Squadron, Tactical on 1 July 1958
 Inactivated on 1 April 1964
 Consolidated with the 22d Reconnaissance Squadron as the 622d Air Refueling Squadron, Heavy on 19 September 1985 (remained inactive)
 Converted to provisional status and redesignated 622d Expeditionary Air Refueling Squadron on 7 July 2000
 Activated on 24 July 2000
 Inactivated on 22 December 2004

Assignments
 5th Photographic Group (later 5th Photographic Reconnaissance and Mapping Group): 2 September 1942 (attached to Eighth Air Force after 8 June 1943)
 7th Photographic Reconnaissance and Mapping Group (later 7th Photographic Group, 7th Reconnaissance Group): 7 July 1943 – 21 November 1945
 74th Reconnaissance Group: 23 October 1947 - 27 June 1949
 Ninth Air Force: 1 July 1955 (attached to 366th Fighter-Bomber Wing)
 Eighteenth Air Force: 1 October 1957 (attached to 366th Fighter-Bomber Wing)
 Twelfth Air Force: 1 January 1958 (attached to 366th Fighter-Bomber Wing until 1 July 1958)
 4505th Air Refueling Wing: 18 July 1958
 4440th Aircraft Delivery Group: 8 October 1963 – 1 April 1964 (nonoperational)
 16th Expeditionary Operations Group 24 July 2000 – 22 December 2004

Stations
 Peterson Field, Colorado, 2 September 1942 – 17 May 1943
 RAF Mount Farm, England, 8 June 1943 (detachment operated from Attlebridge, England, 14 February - ca. 6 March 1944)
 RAF Chalgrove, England, 26 March 1945
 Villacoublay Airfield, France, c. 14 October 1945 - ca. 5 December 1945
 Camp Kilmer, New Jersey, 15 December 1945 – 15 December 1945
 Stewart Field, New York, 23 October 1947
 Stamford, Connecticut, 5 March 1948 - 27 June 1949
 Alexandria Air Force Base (later England Air Force Base), Louisiana, 18 July 1955 – 1 April 1964
 Istres-Le Tubé Air Base, 24 July 2000 - 22 December 2004

Aircraft
 Lockheed P-38 Lightning, 1943-1945
 Lockheed F-5 Lightning, 1943-1945
 Supermarine Spitfire, 1943-1945
 North American P-51 Mustang, 1945
 Boeing KB-29M Superfortress, 1955-1957
 Boeing KB-50 Superfortress, 1957-1963
 Boeing KC-135 Stratotanker, 2003-2004

Awards and campaigns

References

Notes
 Explanatory notes

 Citations

Bibliography

 
 
 
 
 
 TacTankers.com - 622d Air Refueling Squadron

External links
 
 

Air refueling squadrons of the United States Air Force
Military units and formations established in 1942
1942 establishments in Colorado